Governor Dinsmoor may refer to:

Samuel Dinsmoor (1766–1835), 14th Governor of New Hampshire
Samuel Dinsmoor Jr. (1799–1869), 22nd Governor of New Hampshire